C-Net, C-net, CNET, CNet, or Cnet may refer to:

 CNET or "c|net" — a computer news website since 1994
 C-Net DS2 or CNet DS2 — bulletin board software for Commodore 64 computer system since 1986

 C-Net or C=Net — an ancestor edition of the C-Net DS2 bulletin board software for the Commodore computer system
 C-Net 128, C-Net Amiga, and CNet Amiga Pro — other editions of the C-Net bulletin board software for the Commodore computer system
 Centre national d'études des télécommunications — the national telecommunications research institute in France from 1944 to 2000
 c-net — a type of polyhedral graph